Kerava railway station is located in the town of Kerava, Finland. Six tracks run through the station, three of which have platforms for passenger traffic. Kerava is a significant junction station, with connections from the main track from Helsinki to Riihimäki to the tracks to Lahti, Sköldvik, Porvoo, and to the Vuosaari Harbour.

The station house is uncommonly large and was built in 1876-1878 and extended in 1904. When the house was built the station had already been operational for over ten years.

Services 

No long-distance services make stops at Kerava.

Gallery

External links

References 

Railway station
Railway stations in Uusimaa